The Minneapolis Convention Center is a large convention center located in downtown Minneapolis, Minnesota that opened in 1990. It is located one block away from Nicollet Mall near Orchestra Hall.  The Minneapolis Convention Center has a quadruple-domed roof and because of its volume can host multiple events on the same day.

References

External links
Official site

Convention centers in Minnesota
Buildings and structures in Minneapolis
Tourist attractions in Minneapolis